Samuel Sherwood may refer to:
 Samuel Sherwood (New York politician), American Congressman
 Samuel Sherwood (Canadian politician), Canadian lawyer and member of the legislative assemblies of Upper and Lower Canada
 Samuel B. Sherwood, U.S. Representative from Connecticut
 Samuel Sherwood (chief constable), chief constable of Toronto
 Samuel Sherwood (Minister), Preacher during the American Revolution